Matangesvara Temple is a Hindu temple located in the town of Kanchipuram in Tamil Nadu, India. Dedicated to Shiva, the temple is believed to have been constructed by the Pallavas at the end of the 8th century. The peculiarity of the shrine is that the dvarapalas have four hands.

Nearest Hindu Temple
Arulmigu Thirumagaraleeswar Temple, Magaral

References 

 

 

Hindu temples in Kanchipuram
Shiva temples in Kanchipuram district